In queueing theory, a discipline within the mathematical theory of probability, the backpressure routing algorithm is a method for directing traffic around a queueing network that achieves maximum network throughput, which is established using concepts of Lyapunov drift. Backpressure routing considers the situation where each job can visit multiple service nodes in the network.  It is an extension of max-weight scheduling where each job visits only a single service node.

Introduction

Backpressure routing is an algorithm for dynamically routing traffic over a multi-hop network by using congestion gradients. The algorithm can be applied to wireless communication networks,  including sensor networks, mobile ad hoc networks (MANETS), and heterogeneous networks with wireless and wireline components.

Backpressure principles can also be applied to other areas, such as to the study of
product assembly systems and processing networks.
This article focuses on communication networks,
where packets from multiple data streams arrive and
must be delivered to appropriate destinations.  The backpressure
algorithm operates in slotted time. Every time slot it seeks to route data in directions that
maximize the differential backlog between neighboring nodes.  This is similar to how water
flows through a network of pipes via pressure gradients.  However, the backpressure algorithm
can be applied to multi-commodity networks (where different packets may have different destinations),
and to networks where transmission rates can be selected
from a set of (possibly time-varying) options.  Attractive features
of the backpressure algorithm are: (i) it leads to maximum network throughput, (ii)
it is provably robust to time-varying network conditions, (iii) it
can be implemented without knowing traffic arrival rates or channel state
probabilities. However, the algorithm may introduce large delays, and may
be difficult to implement exactly in networks with interference.   Modifications of
backpressure that reduce delay and simplify implementation are described below
under Improving delay and Distributed backpressure.

Backpressure routing has mainly been studied in a theoretical
context.  In practice, ad hoc wireless networks have typically
implemented alternative routing methods based on shortest
path computations or network flooding, such as
Ad Hoc on-Demand Distance Vector Routing (AODV),
geographic routing, and extremely opportunistic routing (ExOR).
However, the mathematical optimality properties of backpressure
have motivated recent experimental demonstrations of its use
on wireless testbeds at the University of Southern California
and at North Carolina State University.

Origins

The original backpressure algorithm was developed by Tassiulas and Ephremides. They considered a multi-hop packet radio network with random packet arrivals and a fixed set of link selection options. Their algorithm consisted of a max-weight link selection stage and a differential backlog routing stage.
An algorithm related to backpressure,
designed for computing multi-commodity
network flows, was developed in Awerbuch and Leighton.
The backpressure algorithm was later extended by Neely, Modiano, and Rohrs to treat scheduling for mobile networks.
Backpressure is mathematically analyzed via the theory of Lyapunov drift, and can be used jointly with flow control mechanisms to provide network utility maximization.
(see also Backpressure with utility optimization and penalty minimization).

How it works

Backpressure routing is designed to make decisions that (roughly) minimize the sum of squares of queue backlogs
in the network from one timeslot to the next.   The precise mathematical development of this technique is described in
later sections.  This section describes the general network model and the operation of backpressure routing with respect
to this model.

The multi-hop queueing network model

Consider a multi-hop network with N nodes (see Fig. 1 for an example with N = 6).
The network operates in
slotted time .  On each slot, new data can arrive to
the network, and routing and transmission scheduling decisions are made
in an effort to deliver all data to its proper destination.  Let data that is destined
for node  be labeled as commodity c data. Data in each node is stored according to its commodity. A closeup of the queue backlogs inside a node is shown in Fig. 2.
The units of  depend on the context of the problem.
For example, backlog can take integer units of packets, which is useful in cases when data is segmented into fixed length packets. Alternatively, it can take real valued units of bits. It is assumed that  for all  and all timeslots t, because no node stores data destined for itself. Every timeslot, nodes can transmit data to others. Data that is transmitted from one node to another node is removed from the queue of the first node and added to the queue of the second. Data that is transmitted to its destination is removed from the network.
be delivered to node c.

Let  be the transmission rate used by the network over link (a,b) on slot t, representing the amount of data it can transfer from node a to node b on the current slot. Let  be the transmission rate matrix. These transmission rates must be selected within a set of possibly time-varying options.  Specifically,
the network may have time-varying channels and node
mobility, and this can affect its transmission capabilities every slot.
To model this, let S(t) represent the topology state of the network, which captures
properties of the network on slot t that affect transmission. Let  represent the set
of transmission rate matrix options available under topology state S(t).
Every slot t, the network controller observes S(t) and chooses transmission
rates  within the set .
The choice of which  matrix
to select on each slot t is described in the next subsection.

This time-varying network model was first developed for the case when transmission rates every slot t were determined by general functions of a channel state matrix and a power allocation matrix.  The model can also be used when rates are determined by other control decisions, such as server allocation, sub-band selection, coding type, and so on.  It assumes the supportable transmission rates are known and there are no transmission errors.  Extended formulations of backpressure routing can be used for networks with probabilistic channel errors, including networks that exploit the wireless broadcast advantage via multi-receiver diversity.

The backpressure control decisions

Every slot t the backpressure controller observes S(t) and performs the following 3 steps:
 First, for each link (a,b), it selects an optimal commodity  to use.
 Finally, it determines the amount of commodity  it will transmit over link (a,b) (being at most , but possibly being less in some cases).

Choosing the optimal commodity

Each node a observes its own queue backlogs and the backlogs in its current
neighbors.  A current neighbor of node a is a node b such that it is possible to choose
a non-zero transmission rate  on the current slot.
Thus, neighbors are determined by the set .  In the extreme case, a
node can have all N − 1 other nodes as neighbors.  However, it is common to use sets  that preclude transmissions between nodes that are separated by more than a certain geographic distance,
or that would have a propagated signal strength below a certain threshold.
Thus, it is typical for the number of neighbors
to be much less than N − 1. The example in Fig. 1 illustrates neighbors by link connections, so that node 5 has neighbors 4 and 6.  The example suggests a symmetric relationship between neighbors (so that if 5 is a neighbor of 4, then 4 is a neighbor of 5), but this need not be the case in general.

The set of neighbors of a given node determines the set of outgoing links it can use for transmission on the current slot.  For each outgoing link (a,b), the optimal commodity   is defined as the commodity  that maximizes the following differential backlog quantity:

 

Any ties in choosing the optimal commodity are broken arbitrarily.

An example is shown in Fig. 2.  The example assumes each queue currently has only 3 commodities:  red, green, and
blue, and these are measured in integer units of packets.   Focusing on the directed link (1,2), the differential backlogs are:

 

 

 

Hence, the optimal commodity to send over link (1,2) on slot t is the green commodity.  On the other hand, the optimal commodity to send over the reverse link (2,1) on slot t is the blue commodity.

Choosing the μab(t) matrix

Once the optimal commodities have been determined for each link (a,b), the network controller computes the following weights :

 

The weight  is the value of the differential backlog associated with the optimal commodity
for link (a,b), maxed with 0.  The controller then chooses transmission rates as the solution to
the following max-weight problem (breaking ties arbitrarily):

 

 

As an example of the max-weight decision, suppose that on the current slot t, the differential backlogs on each link of the 6 node network lead to link weights  given by:

 

While the set  might contain an uncountably infinite number
of possible transmission rate matrices, assume for simplicity that the current topology state admits only 4 possible
choices:

 

illustration of the 4 possible transmission rate selections under the current topology state S(t). Option (a) activates
All other options use two links, with transmission rates of 1 on each of the activated links.

These four possibilities are represented in matrix form by:

 

 

Observe that node 6 can neither send nor receive under any of these possibilities.
This might arise because node 6 is currently out of communication range.
The weighted sum of rates for each of the 4 possibilities are:
 Choice (a): .
 Choice (b): .
 Choice (c): .
 Choice (d): .

Because there is a tie for the maximum weight of 12, the network controller can break the tie arbitrarily by
choosing either option  or option .

Finalizing the routing variables

Suppose now that the optimal commodities 
have been determined for each link, and the transmission
rates  have also been determined.
If the differential backlog for the optimal commodity on a given link (a,b) is negative, then no data is transferred
over this link on the current slot.  Else, the network offers to send  units of commodity 
data over this link.  This is done by defining routing variables
 for each link (a,b) and
each commodity c, where:

 

The value of  represents the transmission rate offered to commodity c data over link
(a,b) on slot t.
However, nodes might not have enough of a certain commodity to support transmission
at the offered rates on all of their outgoing links.  This arises on slot t for node n and commodity c if:

 

In this case, all of the  data is sent, and null data is used to fill the unused portions of the offered rates,
allocating the actual data and null data arbitrarily over the corresponding outgoing links (according to the offered rates).
This is called a queue underflow situation.   Such underflows do not affect the throughput
or stability properties of the network.  Intuitively, this is because underflows
only arise when the transmitting node has a low amount of backlog, which means the
node is not in danger of instability.

Improving delay

The backpressure algorithm does not use any pre-specified paths.  Paths are learned
dynamically, and may be different for different packets.  Delay can be very large, particularly when the system is lightly
loaded so that there is not enough pressure to push data towards the destination.  As an example, suppose one packet
enters the network, and nothing else ever enters.  This packet may take a loopy walk through the network and never arrive
at its destination because no pressure gradients build up.  This does not contradict the throughput optimality or stability
properties of backpressure because the network has at most one packet at any time and hence is trivially stable (achieving a delivery rate of 0, equal to the arrival rate).

It is also possible to implement backpressure on a set of pre-specified paths.  This can restrict the capacity region, but might improve in-order
delivery and delay.  Another way to improve delay, without affecting the capacity region, is to use an enhanced
version that biases link weights towards desirable directions.  Simulations of such biasing have shown significant delay improvements.
Note that backpressure does not require First-in-First-Out  (FIFO) service at the queues.  It has been observed
that Last-in-First-Out (LIFO) service can dramatically improve delay for the vast majority of packets,
without affecting throughput.

Distributed backpressure

Note that once the transmission rates  have been selected, the routing decision variables

can be computed in a simple distributed manner, where each node only requires knowledge of
queue backlog differentials between itself and its neighbors. However, selection of the transmission rates requires a solution to the
max-weight problem in Eqs. (1)-(2).  In the special case when channels are orthogonal, the algorithm has a natural distributed implementation and reduces to separate decisions at each node. However, the max-weight problem is a centralized control problem for networks with inter-channel interference. It can also be very difficult to solve even in a centralized way. 

A distributed approach for interference networks with link rates that are determined by the signal-to-noise-plus-interference ratio (SINR) can be carried out using randomization.  Each node randomly decides to transmit every slot t (transmitting a "null" packet if it currently does not
have a packet to send).  The actual transmission rates, and the corresponding actual packets to send,
are determined by a 2-step handshake:
On the first step, the randomly selected transmitter nodes send a pilot signal with signal strength proportional
to that of an actual transmission. On the second step,
all potential receiver nodes measure the resulting interference and send that information back to the
transmitters.  The SINR levels for all outgoing links (n,b) are then known to all nodes n,
and each node n can decide
its  and  variables based on this information.
The resulting throughput is not necessarily optimal.  However, the random transmission process can be viewed as a part of the channel state process (provided that null packets are sent in cases of underflow, so that the channel state process does not depend on past decisions).  Hence, the resulting throughput of this distributed implementation is optimal over the class of all routing and scheduling algorithms that use such randomized transmissions.

Alternative distributed implementations can roughly be grouped into two classes:
The first class of algorithms consider constant multiplicative factor approximations to the max-weight problem,
and yield constant-factor throughput results.  The second class of algorithms consider additive approximations to the max-weight
problem, based on updating solutions to the max-weight problem over time.  Algorithms in this second class seem to require static channel
conditions and longer (often non-polynomial) convergence times, although they can provably achieve maximum throughput
under appropriate assumptions. Additive approximations are often useful
for proving optimality of backpressure when implemented with out-of-date queue backlog information (see Exercise 4.10 of the Neely text).

Mathematical construction via Lyapunov drift

This section shows how the backpressure algorithm arises as a natural consequence of
greedily minimizing a bound on the change in the sum of squares of queue backlogs from one slot to the next.

Control decision constraints and the queue update equation

Consider a multi-hop network with N nodes, as described in the above section.
Every slot t, the network controller observes the topology state S(t) and chooses
transmission rates  and routing variables
 subject
to the following constraints:

 

 

 

Once these routing variables are determined, transmissions are made (using idle fill if necessary), and the resulting queue
backlogs satisfy the following:

 

where  is the random amount of new commodity c
to commodity c traffic on link (n,b) on slot t.  Note that  may be more than the amount of
commodity c data that is actually transmitted on link (a,b) on slot t.  This is because there may not be enough backlog
in node n.  For this same reason, Eq. (6) is an inequality, rather than an equality, because
 may be more than the actual endogenous arrivals of commodity c to node n on slot t.
An important feature of Eq. (6)  is that it holds even if the  decision variables are chosen independently of queue backlogs.

It is assumed that  for all slots t and all , as no queue stores data destined for itself.

Lyapunov drift

Define  as the matrix of current queue backlogs.
Define the following non-negative function, called a Lyapunov function:

This is a sum of the squares of queue backlogs (multiplied by 1/2 only for convenience in later analysis). The above sum is the same as summing over all n, c such that  because  for all  and all slots t.

The conditional Lyapunov drift   is defined:

 

 

By squaring the queue update equation (Eq. (6)) and using the above inequality, it is not difficult
to show that for all slots t and under any algorithm for choosing transmission and routing variables 
and :

 

where B is a finite constant that depends on the second moments of arrivals and the maximum possible second moments of transmission rates.

Minimizing the drift bound by switching the sums

(7).

 

where the finite sums have been pushed through the expectations to illuminate the maximizing decision.
By the principle of opportunistically maximizing an expectation, the above expectation is maximized by
maximizing the function inside of it (given the observed).
Thus, one chooses  and 
subject to the constraints Eqs. (3)-(5) to maximize:

 

It is not immediately obvious what decisions maximize the above.  This can be illuminated by switching the sums.
Indeed, the above expression is the same as below:

 

The weight  is called the current differential backlog of commodity c between
nodes a and b.  The idea is to choose decision variables  so as to maximize the above
weighted sum, where weights are differential backlogs.  Intuitively, this means allocating larger rates in directions
of larger differential backlog.

Clearly one should choose 
whenever .   Further, given  for a particular link ,
it is not difficult to show that the optimal   selections,
subject to Eqs. (3)-(5),
are determined as follows:  First find the commodity 
that maximizes the differential backlog for link (a,b).
If the maximizing differential backlog is negative for link (a,b),
assign  for all commodities 
on link (a,b). Else, allocate the full link rate  to the commodity , and zero rate to all other commodities on this link.  With this choice, it follows that:

 

where  is the differential backlog of the optimal commodity for link (a,b) on slot t (maxed with 0):

 

It remains only to choose .  This is done by solving the following:

 

 

The above problem is identical to the max-weight problem in Eqs. (1)-(2).

A remarkable property of the backpressure algorithm is that it acts greedily every slot t based only on the observed topology state S(t) and queue backlogs  for that slot.  Thus, it does not require knowledge of the arrival rates  or the topology state probabilities .

Performance analysis

This section proves throughput optimality of the backpressure algorithm.  For simplicity, the scenario where events are independent and identically
distributed (i.i.d.) over slots is considered, although the same algorithm can be shown to work in non-i.i.d. scenarios (see
below under Non-i.i.d. operation and universal scheduling).

Dynamic arrivals

Let  be the matrix of exogenous arrivals on slot t.  Assume this matrix is independent and identically
distributed (i.i.d.) over slots with finite second moments and with means:

 

It is assumed that  for all , as no data arrives that is destined for itself.  Thus,
the matrix of arrival rates  is a  matrix of non-negative real numbers, with zeros on the diagonal.

Network capacity region

Assume the topology state S(t) is i.i.d. over slots with probabilities 
(if S(t) takes values in an uncountably infinite set of vectors with real-valued entries,
then  is a probability distribution, not a probability mass function).
A general algorithm for the network observes S(t) every slot t and chooses transmission rates  and routing variables  according to the constraints in Eqs. (3)-(5). The network capacity region  is the closure of the set of all arrival rate matrices  for which there exists an algorithm that stabilizes the network. Stability of all queues implies that the total input rate of traffic into the network is the same as the total rate of data delivered to its destination. It can be shown that for any arrival rate matrix  in the capacity region , there is a stationary and randomized algorithm that chooses decision variables  and 
every slot t based only on S(t) (and hence independently of queue backlogs)
that yields the following for all :

 

Such a stationary and randomized algorithm that bases decisions only on S(t) is called an S-only algorithm. In that case, there is an S-only algorithm that yields the following for all :

 

As a technical requirement, it is assumed that the second moments of transmission rates  are finite under any algorithm for choosing these rates.  This trivially holds if there is a finite maximum rate .

Comparing to S-only algorithms

(7), we have:

 

where  and 
are any alternative decisions that satisfy Eqs. (3)-(5), including randomized decisions.

Now assume .  Then there exists an S-only algorithm that satisfies
Eq. (8).  Plugging this into the right-hand-side of Eq. (10)  and noting that the conditional expectation given  under this S-only algorithm is the same as the unconditional expectation (because S(t) is i.i.d. over slots, and the S-only algorithm is independent of current queue backlogs) yields:

 

Thus, the drift of a quadratic Lyapunov function is less than or equal to a constant B for all slots t. This fact, together with the assumption that queue arrivals have bounded second moments, imply the following for all network queues:

 

(9)  holds for some alternativeS-only algorithm. Plugging Eq. (9)  into the right-hand-side of Eq. (10)  yields:

 

from which one immediately obtains (see):

 

This average queue size bound increases as the distance  to the boundary of the
capacity region  goes to zero.  This is the same qualitative performance as a single M/M/1 queue with arrival rate
 and service rate , where

Extensions of the above formulation

Non-i.i.d. operation and universal scheduling

The above analysis assumes i.i.d. properties for simplicity.  However, the same backpressure algorithm can be shown to operate robustly in non-i.i.d. situations.  When arrival processes and topology states are ergodic but not necessarily i.i.d., backpressure still stabilizes the system whenever .  More generally, using a universal scheduling approach, it has been shown to offer stability and optimality properties for arbitrary (possibly non-ergodic) sample paths.

Backpressure with utility optimization and penalty minimization

Backpressure has been shown to work in conjunction with flow control via a drift-plus-penalty technique.  This technique greedily maximizes a sum of drift and a weighted penalty expression.  The penalty is weighted by a parameter V that determines a performance tradeoff.
This technique ensures throughput utility is within O(1/V) of optimality while average delay is O(V).  Thus, utility can be pushed arbitrarily close to optimality, with a corresponding tradeoff in average delay.   Similar properties can be shown for average power minimization
and for optimization of more general network attributes.

Alternative algorithms for stabilizing queues while maximizing a network utility have been developed
using fluid model analysis, joint fluid analysis and Lagrange multiplier analysis, convex optimization, and stochastic gradients. These approaches do not provide the O(1/V), O(V) utility-delay results.

See also
 AODV
 Diversity backpressure routing (DIVBAR)
 Drift plus penalty
 ExOR
 Geographic routing
 List of ad hoc routing protocols
 Lyapunov optimization
 References 

Primary sources
 L. Tassiulas and A. Ephremides, "Stability Properties of Constrained Queueing Systems and Scheduling Policies for Maximum Throughput in Multihop Radio Networks," IEEE Transactions on Automatic Control, vol. 37, no. 12, pp. 1936–1948, Dec. 1992.
 L. Georgiadis, M. J. Neely, and L. Tassiulas, "Resource Allocation and Cross-Layer Control in Wireless Networks," Foundations and Trends in Networking, vol. 1, no. 1, pp. 1–149, 2006.
 M. J. Neely. Stochastic Network Optimization with Application to Communication and Queueing Systems'', Morgan & Claypool, 2010.

Networking algorithms
Queueing theory
Routing algorithms